Kyllburg is a former Verbandsgemeinde ("collective municipality") in Waldeifel region in the district Bitburg-Prüm, in Rhineland-Palatinate, Germany. The seat of the Verbandsgemeinde was in Kyllburg. On 1 July 2014 it merged into the new Verbandsgemeinde Bitburger Land.

The Verbandsgemeinde Kyllburg consisted of the following Ortsgemeinden ("local municipalities"):

Former Verbandsgemeinden in Rhineland-Palatinate